Cameron Siskowic (born April 10, 1984) is a former Canadian football linebacker. He was signed by the Cincinnati Bengals as an undrafted free agent in 2006. He played college football at Illinois State.

Siskowic was also a member of the Minnesota Vikings and Hamilton Tiger-Cats.

External links
Just Sports Stats
Hamilton Tiger-Cats bio
Illinois State Redbirds bio

1984 births
Living people
Players of American football from San Diego
Players of Canadian football from San Diego
American football linebackers
American players of Canadian football
Canadian football linebackers
Washington State Cougars football players
Illinois State Redbirds football players
Cincinnati Bengals players
Minnesota Vikings players
Hamilton Tiger-Cats players